The Year of Getting to Know Us is a 2008 American comedy-drama film directed by Patrick Sisam and starring Tom Arnold, Jimmy Fallon, Lucy Liu and Sharon Stone. It premiered on January 24, 2008 at the Sundance Film Festival.

Premise
Christopher Rocket is a man loyal to his work but unable to fulfill his girlfriend Anne or anything else in his personal life. He came back to his hometown after his estranged father Tom Rocket suffers a stroke. Jane Rocket, his mother, is a central figure in his dysfunctional past.

However, once freed completely from his past demons, Christopher is finally able to commit.

Cast
Tom Arnold as  Ron Rocket
Jimmy Fallon as Christopher Rocket
Chase Ellison as Young Christopher Rocket
Sharon Stone as Jane Rocket
Lucy Liu as Anne
Paul Spicer as Security Guard

Reception
The film was not very well received by film critics, resulting in mostly negative reviews, with Rotten Tomatoes giving it an 18% "Rotten" rating.

References

External links

2008 films
2008 comedy-drama films
American comedy-drama films
Films scored by John Swihart
Films shot in Jacksonville, Florida
2000s English-language films
2000s American films